Rudolf Cornelis van der Nagel (28 May 1889 in Buitenzorg, Dutch East Indies – 10 October 1949) was a Dutch amateur football (soccer) player.

He was a part of the Dutch Olympic team which won the bronze medal in the 1912 tournament. Due to being a reserve player, he did not play in any of the matches and was not awarded a medal. He made one appearance for the Netherlands national team in 1914. He was a soldier by profession and in 1918 married Campegina Vitringa in Harderwijk.

References

1889 births
1949 deaths
Dutch footballers
Olympic footballers of the Netherlands
Footballers at the 1912 Summer Olympics
People from Bogor
Association football midfielders
Netherlands international footballers
Dutch people of the Dutch East Indies